Ram-raiding is a type of burglary in which a heavy vehicle is driven into the windows or doors of a building, usually a department store or jeweller's shop, to allow the perpetrators to loot it.

Overview
The term came into widespread use after a series of such raids in Belfast, Northern Ireland, in 1979 that was covered in news reports and in countries such as Australia and New Zealand that inspired a series of similar crimes.
 
Notably, large trucks are used to break into technology companies and steal high-value equipment for resale on the black market.

Commercial properties in areas prone to ram-raids often erect barriers or obstructions, such as bollards, to discourage such attacks. Automated teller machines are also targets of ram-raiding, with criminals smashing the machines to steal cash boxes.

Many companies have come up with solutions to ram-raiding. Everything from electronic bollards to electronic barriers has been employed to keep property from the raiders.

Another solution is security guards, but round-the-clock teams are expensive and often not the most economical way of dealing with ram-raiding.

See also 
 Smash and grab
 Vehicle-ramming attack

References

External links
 

Burglary
Car crime